The Story of Bohemian Rhapsody is a 2004 documentary about the song "Bohemian Rhapsody", written by the lead singer of Queen, Freddie Mercury.

The program 
The Story of Bohemian Rhapsody is narrated by Richard E. Grant, and runs for approximately 57 minutes. Throughout the programme, Brian May and Roger Taylor revisit the place where they recorded the 1975 album A Night at the Opera, and discuss the song and the video.

External links
 

Queen (band)
British documentary films
Rockumentaries
2004 films
2004 documentary films
2000s British films